New Academics is a four-piece Funk rock band formed in Cape Town, South Africa. They are currently based in Johannesburg. They are known for their mixture of Afro-beat, Jazz, Hard rock, Funk and Hip hop in their music and have built a solid a following in South Africa and Europe with their debut album City of Strange.

In 2008, the New Academics were nominated for a SAMA (South African Music Award) in the category of "Best Alternative Album".

Members

Current
Joe Penn — vocals (2004–present)
David Baudains — guitar (2004–present)
Jacques Du Plessis — bass guitar (2016–present)
Rob Storm — drums (2014–present)

Previous
Richard Broderick — drums (2004 -2005)
Martin Labuschagne — bass (2006-2009)
Damian Staz — drums (2006)
Howie Combrink — drums (2006–2007, 2009–2010)
Brendon van Rooyen — drums (2007-2009)
Sean Strydom — bass (2010)
Hugh Hunt — bass (2014–2016)

Discography

 2016 — "Growler Front"
 2006 — City of Strange, Seed Music/Sheer Sound
 2008 — The Apple

References

South African rock music groups